Northam or North Ham, may refer to:

People
 Northam (surname)
 Northam Warren (1878–1962), U.S. inventor

Places
 Northam, Devon - a town in Devon, England, UK
 Northam railway station (Devon)
 Northam, South Africa - a small town in North West Province, South Africa
 Northam, Southampton - A district of the city of Southampton, England, UK
 Northam Bridge, River Itchen
 Northam, Western Australia - a town and shire in Western Australia, Australia
 Northam railway station, Western Australia
 Northam Post Office
 Town of Northam - a local government area
 Shire of Northam - a shire
 Electoral district of Northam
 Northam Road, George Town, Penang, Malaysia

Other uses
 Battle of Northam (1069), Northam, Devonshire, England, UK

See also

Old Northam Road, Perth, Western Australia, Australia
North Ham, the northern part of Ham, London, England, UK
Ham-Nord, Quebec, Canada
 Northam railway station (disambiguation), several stations
 
 
 
 North (disambiguation)
 Ham (disambiguation)